The 2005 Labour Day Weekend Grand Prix of Mosport was the eighth race for the 2005 American Le Mans Series season and the twentieth IMSA SportsCar Championship race at the facility.  It took place on September 4, 2005. The race was won overall by Dyson Racing drivers Butch Leitzinger and James Weaver in a MG-Lola EX257.

Official results

Class winners in bold.  Cars failing to complete 70% of winner's distance marked as Not Classified (NC).

Statistics
 Pole Position - #20 Dyson Racing - 1:07.682
 Fastest Lap - #16 Dyson Racing - 1:08.596
 Distance - 
 Average Speed -

References

External links
 2005 Grand Prix of Mosport Race Broadcast (American Le Mans Series YouTube Channel)

Mosport
Grand Prix of Mosport
Mosport
2005 in Ontario